The Friedrichshafen FF.21 was a German multirole flying boat of the 1910s produced by Flugzeugbau Friedrichshafen.

Specifications

References

Bibliography

Further reading

Friedrichshafen aircraft
Floatplanes